HMAS Penguin is a Royal Australian Navy (RAN) base located at Balmoral on the lower north shore of Sydney Harbour in the suburb of Mosman, New South Wales. Penguin is one of the RAN's primary training establishments, with a responsibility for providing trained specialists for all areas of the navy. The current commander of Penguin is Commander Bernadette Alexander, RAN.

History
Penguin was initially established as the Balmoral Naval Depot and was also known as Penguin II in 1941 as a depot for the RAN's main naval base at Garden Island (on Sydney Harbour). In addition to accommodation for 700 personnel, as well as all the necessary administrative facilities, the Balmoral Naval Hospital was built on the site. Penguin II was commissioned in July 1942, and was renamed as simply HMAS Penguin in January 1943, when the Garden Island facility was renamed HMAS Kuttabul. In addition to its role as a depot, Penguin served as a base for the motor launches responsible for patrolling Sydney Harbour.

After the end of World War II, Penguin began its service as a training establishment. The RAN Seamanship School was located at Penguin from 1945 to 1974, while from 1951 to 1954 it was the Navy's National Service Recruit School. Penguin has also played host to the RAN Staff College and the Security and Naval Police Coxswains School. In addition, a number of operational units of the RAN have been based at Penguin, including Clearance Diving Teams One and Two, and the Royal Navy's Fourth Submarine Squadron.

Facilities and operational units
As part of the RAN Navy Systems Command, the  Penguin site is home to several of the navy's major specialist training schools, including:
ADF Diving School (ADFDS)
RAN Hydrographic School
RAN Medical School

In addition, Penguin was also home to the navy's principal medical facility, Balmoral Naval Hospital, which provided  some of the trained personnel for the Primary Casualty Receiving Facilities [PCRF] on the RAN's Kanimbla class vessels. Balmoral Naval Hospital closed 13 March 2008 for refurbishment.  The Navy's hospital care will be provided through a contract with St Vincent's Hospital, located in Darlinghurst. As well as this, Penguin is the home of the Submarine and Underwater Medicine Unit (SUMU), the RAN Recompression Chamber Facility (RCCF), Maritime Operational Health Unit (MOHU), the ADF Centre for Mental Health and the Penguin Health Centre. In 2006, Penguin received as lodger units both Headquarters and 1st Commando Company (1Coy) of the 1st Commando Regiment.

Gallery

See also
List of Royal Australian Navy bases

References

External links

HMAS Penguin official website

Penguin
Military education and training in Australia
Fleet Base East
Military installations established in 1941
1941 establishments in Australia
Mosman Council
Buildings and structures in Sydney
Military installations in New South Wales